is a Japanese horror anthology manga series written and illustrated by Junji Ito.  It was serialized in Nemuki between April 2013 and February 2014 as seven separate short stories, with an eighth being added for the tankōbon release.  Viz Media published it in North America under its Viz Signature imprint.  The Junji Ito Collection anime anthology, which premiered in January 2018, adapts several stories from Fragments of Horror.

Plot
The book is a collection of eight short stories:

 
Sonoka's husband Tomio refuses to leave his futon for fear of "dark nature spirits" that he says are everywhere. Tomio explains that he had a one night stand with a mysterious woman who turned out to be a demon, and that ever since then, he has seen the spirits everywhere he looks. One evening when Sonoka is in bed, she suddenly begins to see the spirits, as well as the demon Tomio encountered, and flees the apartment, not returning for an entire month.  When she does, she finds Tomio in a near trance-like state and still inside the futon, which is overgrown with a hallucinogenic mold that had been responsible for everything the two had seen.

 
Megumi's house has recently been designated a Tangible Cultural Property.  One day, a woman named Manami Kino visits to see the house, hoping to see it for her architecture class.  Claiming to be enamored with the house, which she calls "sexy", she asks if she can board there, and Megumi's father agrees.  Eventually, the two are married.  One night, however, Megumi stumbles upon Manami rubbing herself naked against the walls of the house.  Later, she comes downstairs to find her father frantically trying to scrub away eyes which have suddenly appeared in the floorboards.  They escape as the house comes alive around them and transforms into a hideous, hairy lump.  Manami has disappeared, presumably having merged with the building, which is subsequently delisted as a national treasure.

 
Tomio arrives at his girlfriend Sonoka's apartment begging for help.  Three days ago, the two had broken up after Tomio began an affair with a fortune teller they had visited together.  As Tomio and the fortune teller lie in bed, she professes to be in love with his head, and asks if she can have it, proceeding to pluck one of her hairs and begin garroting him. After he makes her desist, she gives him a turtleneck sweater to hide the mark and takes him to see "something good", which turns out to be a collection of severed heads.  As Tomio flees, her hair, which was concealed in the collar of the sweater, begins to contract, cutting into his neck and forcing him to support his head with his both hands.  He explains the situation to Sonoka and she calls an ambulance; instead of an ambulance, however, the fortune teller arrives. She tortures Tomio by inserting a live cockroach into the slit in his neck, causing Sonoka to stab her to death with a pair of scissors.  As her body disintegrates, a trio of demonic children appear and attack Tomio, calling him "Daddy" and asking to play.  They knock his head off as Sonoka screams in terror, believing Tomio to be dead.  Some time later, the two awaken to find that his head is reattached, and conclude that the children must have been a hallucination. However, the memory of the incident leaves Tomio traumatized, and he continues to support his head long after the incident.

 
After her mother died when she was young, Riko has been plagued by nightmares of her father dying.  After she marries Makoto of the Tokura family, she notices that some of his older relatives are translucent, like ghosts.  He explains that they are what his family call "afterimages", created by the family's prayers.  The afterimages slowly fade over the course of twenty years or so, giving their grieving family members time to say goodbye, and for the deceased to bring closure to their life.  One day, ten years later, Riko sees Makoto with Ms. Mori, a woman from his office.  When she confronts him, he states that he and Mori intend to get married.  He apologizes for not telling the truth, and tells Riko that on the day of their engagement, she was struck and killed by a car. Heartbroken, Makoto enlisted his family in creating an afterimage of Riko, and she had remained that way ever since. The next day, Riko, who is beginning to fade, leaves the Tokura household and returns to her father, intent to spend her remaining time with him.

 
Tatsuro Kamata is a medical student taking dissection training.  On the first day, one of the cadavers is discovered to in fact be alive, and begs to be dissected, before fleeing the lab.  Tatsuro recognizes her as Ruriko Tamiya, who he knew as a child, and who had an unnatural fixation on vivisection, forcing him to participate in her experiments and at one point even threatening to dissect him.  After she accosts him on the street, he rushes home, only to find her waiting for him with a scalpel, begging to be dissected.  Horrified, he flees as her stomach begins to deform, trying to convince himself that it is a dream.  Over the next few days, the media reports the occurrence of incidents of a similar nature, such as a man stabbing a woman in a stomach, followed by the surgeons who operated on her going insane.  Twenty years later, Tatsuro has gone on to become a senior doctor, and is in the process of training his own class of medical students in dissection.  One of the cadavers supplied is that of Ruriko, this time clearly dead.  However, when the students cut her open, they find her insides to be a bizarre and unnerving amalgamation of the animals she dissected during her life.

 
A birdwatcher named Kume finds a man in the forest, with both his legs broken.  At the hospital, police question the man, named Shiro Moriguchi, as to how he survived living in the wild in that condition for a month.  He claims to have rationed his food, but asks Kume to stay with him that evening.  During the night, Kume wakes up to see a strange woman in black feeding Shiro raw meat mouth-to-mouth.  When she leaves, Shiro relates how she has been feeding him this way for the entire month, keeping him alive, yet is not stopping now that he has been rescued.  The following night, she comes again, this time bearing an eyeball.  Kume chases after her, only to see her transform into a giant black bird and fly away.  Upon analyzing the meat samples, the police determine that they came from a human.  The woman does not appear again, and Shiro recovers, choosing to return to Tokyo; however, as his train leaves, Kume sees a large black bird flying after it.  Some years later, Shiro's corpse is discovered being pecked at by a bird high on Mount Fuji.  His journal tells of how the woman returned, this time ripping away his flesh until he died.  DNA testing shows that the flesh which she had fed him while he was in the wild was, in fact, his own, leading Kume to surmise that she had travelled back in time to feed him his own flesh.  Going out birdwatching again, Kume is surprised to see the woman perching in a tree.  He falls, breaking his leg.  She then feeds him a mouthful of unpleasant-tasting meat, commencing the causal loop which will eventually result in his recurrent death and survival.

 
Kaoru Koketsu is a devoted fan of the novelist Magami Nanakuse, who is known for the unique tics that she endows her characters with.  Kaoru prides herself in supposedly having tics similar to Nanakuse's characters, and imitates them for weeks at a time after reading Nanakuse’s works.  After sending the author a letter, she is invited to meet her at her home, where she is unpleasantly surprised to find that Nanakuse is in fact a mean spirited, cross-dressing man, who accuses her of being a "tic faker".  After getting Kaoru drunk, Nanakuse imprisons her in a dungeon under the house. In a meeting with the Town Association, Nanakuse reveals that she had moved to the town because of its supernatural past; the land having been supposedly used for both burials and demonic rituals. Kaoru awakens to find herself trapped in a cell, surrounded by people exhibiting various tics. Nanakuse arrives, and reveals that she takes her inspiration from the tics developed by the people she keeps imprisoned there in darkness, and has hopes that Kaoru will develop one that she has never seen before.  Kaoru resolves not to move to keep from developing one.  Three days later, Nanakuse enters her cell to find that she has become completely rigid and unable to move, her face contorted into a grotesque and deformed expression as a result of attempting to resist the urge to develop a tic.  Nanakuse uses this as the basis of a novel titled Ultimate Tic before placing Kaoru in a glass case and donating her to the Town Association Hall.

 
Shigeki Santo's daughter Mayumi is unable to make even the smallest decisions for herself, relying on others to direct her every motion.  After losing yet another employee who could not handle the stress, a woman named Mitsu Uchida answers his ad.  She proves to be adept at instructing Mayumi, and never takes a day off, becoming very pale and gaunt in the process, all while constantly whispering in Mayumi's ear. Nevertheless, Mayumi manages to gain much confidence under the effects of Mitsu's guidance, and curious, Santo hires a detective agency to trace Mitsu's background. The agency finds that she is living with an abusive man named Aga who has forced her to apply for the high-paying job so she can support him.  One day, Mitsu is found beaten to death.  However, Mayumi continues to function normally, believing that Mitsu is still with her, and even Santo sometimes believes that he can still hear her whispering in his daughter's ear.  Then, one night, Mayumi returns home covered in blood, claiming to have killed Aga on Mitsu's instructions.

Conception and development
Prior to the publication of Fragments of Horror, Junji Ito had not written horror manga for eight years; his last published collection in the genre was Shin Yami no Koe Kaidan in 2006.  Ito wrote that "during those eight years, I was doing plenty of work on illustrations and manga about cats or about society, but even taking that into account, the time seems too empty somehow.  What on Earth was I doing all that time?"  When he submitted the storyboard for the first story, his editor, Mikio Yoshida, expressed concern that Ito's "instincts for horror hadn't returned"; this led him to completely rewrite the story before it was finally published.  Still, Ito felt that it was below his usual quality.

Release
Ito began publishing the series in the first issue of The Asahi Shimbun Company's relaunched shōjo manga magazine Nemuki, publishing the first chapter, on April 13, 2013.  Six more chapters were published between June 13, 2013 and April 12, 2014.  In addition, when the series was published in collected tankōbon form, an additional story, was included.  It had previously been published as a one-shot in the magazine Shinkan in 2009.  Asahi Shimbun released the series as a single volume on July 8, 2014, with a cover designed by Keisuke Minohara.

Viz Media announced via Twitter on December 3, 2014 that it had licensed the anthology, planning to publish it as a single hardcover volume under its Viz Signature imprint in June 2015.  It was released on June 16, 2015.

Adaptation
An anime anthology of Ito's short stories, titled Junji Ito Collection, will adapt stories from Fragments of Horror and several of Ito's other works.  The series premiered on January 5, 2018.

Reception

Reviewing the anthology for Otaku USA magazine, Joseph Luster praised the collection, especially Ito's art, which he called "truly special" and "equal parts gruesome and gorgeous".  He also opined that the book contained several instant classics, and was particularly struck by "Blackbird", which he called "the standout hit".

Nick Creamer of Anime News Network praised Ito for his attempts at finding horror in unexpected places, but felt that it was not uniformly successful.  He noted how Ito's stories tried to subvert familiarity and thus evoke horror, but opined that doing so caused the stories in the collection to walk the "line between the horrifying and the absurd".  He praised Ito's "detailed, unnerving" art, but also felt that sometimes Ito used it to prop up an overall weak story with "one shocking full-page panel".  His one critique of the art was that it tended toward being too formal and thus sometimes lacked personality.

In her review for Fangoria, Svetlana Fedotov called the collection a good entry point for new fans that would also satisfy longtime Ito readers.  Like many other reviewers, she noticed several Lovecraftian influences in the work, and praised Ito for his "innate knack for bringing out the menace in the most innocent of objects."

Chris Randle of The Guardian gave the series a mostly positive review.  He noted that Ito usually avoided being "political" in his stories, and also compared the collection to a toned down version of the ero guro art movement.  Ultimately, he concluded that Ito liked to write stories that were less personal and more fascinated with things beyond comprehension, like Lovecraft but without the latter's political views.

In an in-depth review for The Comics Journal, Joe McCulloch opined that the collection was hardly representative of Ito's best work, with only "Whispering Woman" standing out from the others artistically, yet contained interesting shared themes across many of its stories.  He made note of how most of the interesting characters in the collection were female - either put-upon protagonists or powerful, liberated, and uncaring antagonists, while the majority of male characters were either treacherous or dull.  In his eyes, the common narrative across the collection was one of women confronted by the faithlessness of their male partners and then offered liberation through the actions or example of the consistently female supernatural antagonist.  Ultimately, however, McCulloch felt that these themes were not genuine, but rather a slightly cynical attempt to profit from a magazine with a primarily female audience, a motive that he saw as being satirized in the self-aware "Magami Nanakuse".

Zainab Akhtar of Comics & Cola also noted the focus on stories of women betrayed by men and empowered female villains.  However, she felt that collection was a poorer imitation of his earlier works, "Ito trying to do Ito, and not quite succeeding."  She attributed this to the fact that, while his art maintained its signature horror, the stories failed to connect with the reader on an emotional level.

Shelly Atomic of Comics Bulletin found the collection to be a mix of good and below average stories.  She criticized "Tomio • Red Turtleneck" and "Futon" for being directionless, but praised "Blackbird" and "Gentle Goodbye", the one for a "great twist" and the other for its "surprisingly heartfelt and sweat [sic] story", feeling that they showed that Ito still retained the creative energy that defined his early works.  She also praised the print quality of the volume, noting that the cover and paper was much higher quality than a standard manga.

A number of reviewers have compared the cover of the anthology to Edvard Munch's painting The Scream.

Notes

References

External links
 

Asahi Sonorama manga
Horror anime and manga
Shōjo manga
Viz Media manga
Manga anthologies